is a Japanese professional football player who plays as a forward for Japanese club Vegalta Sendai.

Career
Hiroto Yamada joined Cerezo Osaka when he was young. On 22 October 2016, Yamada made his debut for Cerezo Osaka U-23 in a 1-2 defeat against Blaublitz Akita in J3 League, coming on in the 85 minute. In doing so, Yamada became the first player born in the 2000s to make an appearance in J3 League and any category of Japanese football league system.

After being loaned to Vegalta Sendai in 2020, he scored his first goal in the J1 League in the match against Urawa Red Diamonds in Round 3.

Club stastistics
Updated to 1 December 2022.

References

External links
Profile at Cerezo Osaka

2000 births
Living people
Association football forwards
Association football people from Aichi Prefecture
Japanese footballers
Japan youth international footballers
J1 League players
J2 League players
J3 League players
Cerezo Osaka players
Cerezo Osaka U-23 players
FC Ryukyu players
Vegalta Sendai players